Kyiv offensive or Kiev offensive may refer to:
 Kiev Offensive (1920), a campaign during the Polish–Soviet war
 Kyiv offensive (2022), an axis of operation during the 2022 Russian invasion of Ukraine

See also 
 Battle of Kyiv (disambiguation)